Adam Growe (born July 21, 1967), is a Canadian comedian, licensed Toronto cab driver, and was the host of the Canadian version of Cash Cab.

Born in New York, but raised in Vancouver, he has been performing professionally on radio, television and stage for over 20 years.  Once a full-time Morning DJ, Growe has since transitioned into stand-up comedy and television. He now resides in Toronto, and while shooting Cash Cab, he made his theatrical debut with Adam Growe's The Mom and Pop Shop, a hit one-man show at the 2008 Toronto Fringe Festival. In 2013, he began touring his live trivia stage show The Adam Growe Quiz Show. He played Superintendent McClellan in the television series Monster Warriors.

Growe has starred in his own Just for Laughs Gala and Comedy Now! segment. He also appeared on Comedy Central's Premium Blend, CBS' Star Search and CBC's Comics!.

References

External links 
 Official Website
 
 Cash Cab Canada on Discovery Channel Canada/Discovery HD

Living people
1967 births
Canadian stand-up comedians
Canadian game show hosts
People from New York (state)
Comedians from Vancouver
American emigrants to Canada